is a Japanese ice hockey player for Mikage Gretz and the Japanese national team. She participated at the 2015 IIHF Women's World Championship.

Kondo competed at the 2018 Winter Olympics.

References

External links

1992 births
Living people
Ice hockey players at the 2018 Winter Olympics
Japanese women's ice hockey goaltenders
Olympic ice hockey players of Japan
Sportspeople from Hokkaido
Asian Games medalists in ice hockey
Ice hockey players at the 2017 Asian Winter Games
Medalists at the 2017 Asian Winter Games
Asian Games gold medalists for Japan